Pécs-Baranya Futball Club was a Hungarian football club from the town of Pécs, Hungary.

History
Pécs-Baranya FC debuted in the 1929–30 season of the Hungarian League and finished ninth.

Name Changes 
1926–1935: Pécs-Baranya FC 
1935: merger with Somogy FC

References

External links
 Profile

Football clubs in Hungary
1926 establishments in Hungary